The Amorous Corporal is a 1958 French adventure-comedy film co-written and directed by Robert Darène. Loosely based on the novel La Bigorne, caporal de France by Pierre Nord, it is set in eighteenth-century Madagascar.

It was the first cinematography credit for  Pierre Lhomme.

It aired on cable TV in the US in 1973 as part of a package of non-English language movies called "Movies for Swingers".

Plot

Cast 
 François Périer as La Bigorne
 Rossana Podestà  as Bethi
 Robert Hirsch as Boisrose
 Jean Lefebvre as Potirond
 Jean Carmet as Balluché
 Henri Cogan as Tom Wright

Reception
The film has been widely criticized for its apologetic tones  towards colonialism.

References

External links

The Amorous Corporal at BFI
The Amorous Corporal at Letterbox DVD

French adventure comedy films
1950s adventure comedy films
Films directed by Robert Darène
Films set in Madagascar
Films set in the 18th century
1958 comedy films
1950s French films